The Invisibles is a British 2008 comedy drama series created and written by William Ivory for the BBC. It was produced by Company Pictures, shot in the Republic of Ireland and Northern Ireland.

Premise
Maurice Riley (Head) and Syd Woolsey (Clarke), are "The Invisibles", a team of retired master burglars.  After a string of successful crimes during the 1980s – during which they were never apprehended or identified by the authorities – they retired with their wives to the Spanish Mediterranean coast.  In their heyday, the media turned them into minor folk heroes.

Now getting long in the tooth, they give in to homesickness and return to England, settling in a quiet Devon fishing village. They still have enough money to support themselves comfortably (though not as extravagantly as they might be used to), and look forward to a quiet life of fishing and the benefits of the NHS. Circumstances, however, conspire to pull them back to a life of crime.  Woolsey's son (Tighe) is in trouble with mobsters, and the son of a former associate (Lennox Kelly) idolizes them and wants them to teach him the business.  On top of this, they're feeling old and bored.  Early capers prove to them that security technology and the brutality of the criminal life have changed dramatically in two decades, and they've lost their edge as well.  But the excitement is undeniable, and they try to make a go of it.

Maurice's wife Barbara (Agutter), initially resistant to their plans, can't deny the positive effect it has on Maurice's demeanour.  Their daughter, Grace (Emily Head), is completely unaware how Dad made his money or what he does when he goes out for the evening.

Cast
Warren Clarke as Syd Woolsey
Anthony Head as Maurice Riley
Dean Lennox Kelly as Hedley Huthwaite
Jenny Agutter as Barbara Riley
Emily Head as Grace Riley
Paul Barber as Young Nick
Mina Anwar as Helen Huthwaite
Darren Tighe as Joe Woolsey

Music
The music was especially commissioned and composed by Nick Green and Tristin Norwell.  The brass parts were performed by Guy Barker and Phil Todd.

Production
The series was filmed in the Northern Ireland village of Portaferry, County Down which was considered a good look alike for a Devon village without being so crowded.

It was originally commissioned under the title Desperados but was changed to The Invisibles to match the name used by Head and Clarke's characters, and in reference to how people become "invisible" in society as they get older.

The BBC confirmed in March 2009 that it would not be renewing the series for a second season.

DVD
It was released on DVD 14 July 2008 in the UK, and 26 May 2009 in the US.

Episodes

References

External links
 

BBC Television shows
2000s British comedy-drama television series
2008 British television series debuts
2008 British television series endings
Television series by All3Media